Bolixo is a free software and distributed social media service that was created in 2018.

The recent problems and abuses by social medias such as Cambridge Analytica was the incentive to create Bolixo. We also see here that most social medias evolve until they are sold and lose their original goals.

Project goals

Respect privacy of users.
Separation of duties to enhance security. The web interface does not talk to the database or filesystem directly. It uses micro-services, running in very small lxc containers, each with limited connectivity to the rest of the system.
Digital signature for all messages and documents.
Distributed network of Bolixo nodes, each hosting a few thousands users.
Supports micro-blogging, private channels and document sharing.
Provides a centralized directory where user may publish personal information (name, address, interest) so they can be found.

Functionalities and features

Built on a versioning filesystem. All versions of a document are kept. Currently, only the bofs command line tool makes use of it.
There is a command line tool (bofs) to perform almost everything done with the web interface such as post messages, upload documents, create and maintain groups, etc. It can be used to backup and restore content as well.
Each user has a 2048 bits key used to sign messages and documents. It is also used to remote login into other bolixo nodes.
The web interface uses tabs. It works also on mobile: it uses swipes to navigate between tabs.
Each user may have a public page. It is disabled by default. One may create multiple versions of their public page and select the visible one. The public page contains messages sent to the public group of the user and various documents in the public project.
WEB API to access most functionalities.

Technology

Bolixo is written in tlmp, a variant of C++. It is made of multiple services each running in micro containers. The web interface uses some JavaScript.

Bolixo runs on any Linux distribution (currently fedora (operating system)).

History

Bolixo was started in January 2018. It imported its technology from another project https://truelies.news. Both projects aimed at reducing the influence of fake news on social medias.

Bolixo was released in December 2018.

See also
Distributed social network

External links
Main project page: https://bolixo.org.
Source code: https://solucorp.solutions/repos/solucorp/bolixo/trunk.
Documentation: https://bolixo.org/bolixo.hc?webstep=5.

References

Free software